Vladímir Padrino López (born 30 May 1963) is a Venezuelan four-star general serving as the current Minister of Defense for the National Armed Forces of the Bolivarian Republic of Venezuela since 24 October 2014.

Military career
On 5 July 1981, Padrino graduated from Military Academy of Venezuela. He commanded mortar personnel of the Antonio Ricaurte Infantry Battalion in Rubio, Táchira State. Between February and May 1995, Padrino was sent to the School of the Americas at Fort Benning, Georgia for a "Psychological Operations" and "Advanced Officer training" course by the US Army.  During the 2002 Venezuelan coup d'état attempt, he was a colonel of the Simon Bolivar Infantry Battalion in Fuerte Tiuna, remaining loyal to the government of Hugo Chávez. He was later appointed Chief of Joint Staff of the Strategic Defense Central Region Integral by President Chavez.

In 2013, Padrino became the commander in chief of the Venezuelan Armed forces. On 24 October 2014, Padrino was named by President Nicolas Maduro to be the successor of Carmen Melendez as the Minister of Defense. Currently Padrino and the Minister of People's Power for Defense hold the positions of Strategic Operational commander of the Bolivarian National Armed Forces.

Increased authority
On 12 July 2016, President Nicolás Maduro granted Padrino the powers to distribute food and medicine, authority over all Bolivarian missions, while also having his military command five of Venezuela's main ports, with Maduro stating:

All ministries and government institutions are subordinated to the National Command of the Great Mission for Safe Sovereign and Safe Supply, which is under the command of the President and of the top General, Vladimir Padrino López.

This action performed by President Maduro made General Padrino one of the most powerful people in Venezuela, possibly "the second most powerful man in Venezuelan politics". The appointment of Padrino was also seen to be similar to the Cuban government's tactic of granting the Cuban military the power to manage Cuba's economy.

Written work
Padrino is the author of the manual Preparation Process Operations, which is used as query and serves as a reference in all institutes, schools and universities and vocational training of the Bolivarian National Armed Forces.

Sanctions

Padrino López has been sanctioned by several countries and is banned from entering neighboring Colombia. The Colombian government maintains a list of people banned from entering Colombia or subject to expulsion; as of January 2019, the list had 200 people with a "close relationship and support for the Nicolás Maduro regime".

On 22 September 2017, Canada sanctioned Padrino due to rupture of Venezuela's constitutional order following the 2017 Venezuelan Constituent Assembly election.

The United States government has also sanctioned Padrino on 25 September 2018 for his role in solidifying President Maduro's power in Venezuela.

References

1963 births
Living people
Venezuelan Ministers of Defense
Venezuelan generals
People of the Crisis in Venezuela
Fugitives wanted by the United States